The XVIII SS Army Corps was formed in December 1944 on the Upper Rhine from the remnants of 3 Wehrmacht infantry divisions.

In January 1945, the corps joined the 19th Army until the end of the war. It fought on the upper reaches of the Rhine between Donaueschingen and Schaffhausen. On May 6, 1945, between the Black Forest and the Bodensee, it surrendered to the French First Army.

Commanders
 SS-Gruppenführer Heinz Reinefarth (December 1944 - 12 February 1945) 
 SS-Obergruppenführer Georg Keppler (12 February 1945 - 6 May 1945)

Sources
 Lexicon der Wehrmacht
 okh.it

Waffen-SS corps
Military units and formations established in 1944
Military units and formations disestablished in 1945